Víctor Odín Patiño Bermúdez (born 24 August 1983) is a former Mexican football player.

His current position is goalkeeper for UNAM Pumas. He joined the Pumas youth system and ever since he has worked his way through the ranks to join the senior team. He was a member of the U-20 Selección de fútbol de México (Mexico national team). He has played on Pumas Morelos.

Individual Honours 
 Mexican Primera División: (3)
Pumas UNAM

  Clausura 2009
  Clausura 2004
  Apertura 2004
 Champion of Champions: (1) 2004
 Santiago Bernabeu Cup: (1) 2004

External links
 
 Liguilla Apertura 2004 - Lo que no se vio
 

1983 births
Living people
Club Universidad Nacional footballers
Liga MX players
Footballers from Mexico City
Association football goalkeepers
Mexican footballers